Thomas is a male given name of Aramaic origins. The English spelling "Thomas" is a transliteration; through Latin "Thomas", of the approximate Greek transliteration, from  Aramaic; {תאמא | (tɑʔwmɑʔ)}, from Classic Syriac; {ܬܐܡܐ, | (toma)}, meaning 'twin'. Thomas is recorded in the Greek New Testament as the name of Thomas the Apostle (one of the twelve apostles of Jesus).

Etymology 
The masculine noun  (Tôm) occurs throughout Semitic languages, always meaning 'twin'.

Popularity 
Various historical figures such as Thomas Aquinas and Thomas Jefferson have borne the name. This list of people with given name Thomas contains others.

Europe 
Thomas was a popular name throughout medieval Europe. In Britain the name was rare prior to the Norman Conquest (11th century CE), but by the 13th and 14th centuries it had become common. In 2017 it ranked 13th in popularity in the United Kingdom with 3,246 babies given the name.

United States 
The Social Security Administration lists the name Thomas as the ninth most popular name in the United States over the past 100 years. In 2017 it ranked 48th in popularity  with 7,131 babies given the name.

In other languages 
Afrikaans: Thomas
Albanian: Tom, Thoma, Thomas
Alemmanic: Thömu, Thömus, Thömi
Amharic: ቶማስ (Tomas)
Arabic: توماس (Tūmās)
Aragonese: Tomás
Armenian: Թովմաս (Tʿovmas)
Basque: Tomas
Bavarian: Douma, Dammal, Dammerl
Belarusian: Фама́ (Famá)
Breton: Tomaz
Bulgarian: Тома́ (Tomá)
Catalan: Tomàs
Chinese: , 
Cornish: Tommas
Czech: Tomáš
Danish: Thomas
Dutch: Thomas, Thom
English: Thomas, Tom
Estonian: Toomas
Faroese: Tummas
Finnish: Tuomas, Tommi, Toimi
Flemish: Thom, Thomas
French: Thomas
Frisian: Tomas
Friulian: Tomâs
Galician: Tomé
German: Thomas, Tomas, Tom
Georgian: თომა (Toma), თომას (Tomas)
Greek: Θωμάς (Thomás)
Hawaiian: Koma, Kamaki
Hebrew:  (Ta'om),  (Tomas)
Hungarian: Tamás
Icelandic: Tómas
Irish: Tomás, Tomáisín
Italian: Tommaso, Tomaso, Tom(m)asino
Japanese:  (Tōmasu),  (Tomu)
Korean:  (Doma),  (Tom)
Latin: Thōmās
Latvian: Tomass, Tomas, Toms
Lithuanian: Tomas
Lombard: Tomàs
Macedonian: Тома (Toma)
Maltese: Tumas
Malayalam: Toma
Manx: Thomaase
Maori: Tāmati
Meitei (officially called Manipuri):  (Thōmas),  (Thōmās) 
Norwegian: Thomas, Tomas
Occitan: Tomàs
Persian: توما (Tumâ), توماس‎ (Tumâs)
Polish: Tomasz
Portuguese: Tomé, Tomás
Romanian: Toma
Romansh: Tumasch
Russian:  (Foma)
Sardinian: Tommasu
Scottish Gaelic: Tòmas
Serbo-Croatian: Тома/Toma, Томаш/Tomaš
Sicilian: Tumasi
Slovak: Tomáš, Thomas
Slovene: Tomaž
Spanish: Tomás
Swedish: Thomas, Tomas
Tamil:  (Tāmas),  (Tōmā)
Telugu:  (Thāmas)
Tigrinya:  (Tomas)
Turkish: Tomas
Syriac Aramaic: ܬܐܘܡܐ (Toma)
Ukrainian: Хома (Homa), Тома (Toma)
Vietnamese: Tâm (Tom)
Walloon: Toumas
Welsh: Tomos, Twm

Fictional characters
 Thomas Barrow, the underbutler on the series Downton Abbey
 Thomas Burke, a character from the film Final Destination 2
 Thomas Burke, a character from the video game Mafia III
 Tom Cat also known as Thomas, the titular blue cat from the Tom and Jerry series
 Thomas DuBois, a character from the comic strip and television series The Boondocks
Thomas Gordon, a character from the television drama Ghost Whisperer
 Thomas Jefferson "T.J." Hooker, the main protagonist from the police drama T. J. Hooker
Thomas Shelby, the main protagonist from the crime drama Peaky Blinders 
 Thomas Paris, a character from the science fiction series Star Trek: Voyager
 Tommy Pickles also known as Thomas, the main character from the animated television series The Rugrats, and its spin-off series, All Grown Up
 Thomas Tomone, a fictional character from the television series Skins
 Thomas the Tank Engine, a character in The Railway Series books and the titular protagonist of the Thomas & Friends franchise.
 Thomas, an intern at the park who is a goat in the fourth season of Regular Show
 Thomas, the main character from the novel and film The Maze Runner

See also 
 List of people with given name Thomas
 Thomas (disambiguation)
 Thompson (surname)
 Tommy/Tommie – both are a nickname or shortened form of Thomas, and are sometimes used as a feminine form of Thomas
 Tomi – a Finnish masculine name, also used as a feminine name elsewhere
 Thomasina or Thomasine – the feminine form of Thomas
 Yama, a Hindu deity whose name also means 'twin' in Sanskrit

References 

Given names
English-language masculine given names
English masculine given names
Irish masculine given names
Scottish masculine given names
French masculine given names
German masculine given names
Dutch masculine given names
Norwegian masculine given names
Swedish masculine given names
Danish masculine given names
Hebrew masculine given names
Masculine given names